Albert Ramon (1 November 1920 – 21 March 1993) was a Belgian racing cyclist. He won the Belgian national road race title in 1950. He also rode in the 1948 Tour de France.

References

External links

1920 births
1993 deaths
Belgian male cyclists
Sportspeople from Bruges
Cyclists from West Flanders
20th-century Belgian people